For All We Shared... is the debut album by the band Mostly Autumn. It is the only Mostly Autumn album to feature Allan Scott on drums and Kev Gibbons on whistles.

Track listing

 "Nowhere to Hide (Close my Eyes)" (Findlay/Josh) – 6:12
 "Porcupine Rain" (Findlay/Josh/Jennings) – 4:40
 "The Last Climb" (Josh) – 8:00
 "Heroes Never Die" (Josh/Rayson) – 9:33
 "Folklore" (Trad.) – 5:49
 "Boundless Ocean" (Josh/Jennings) – 5:42
 "Shenanigans" (Faulds) – 3:50
 "Steal Away" (Josh) – 4:56
 "Out of the Inn" (Josh) – 6:43
 "The Night Sky" (Josh) – 10:25

Personnel
 Bryan Josh – 6- and 12-string electric and acoustic lead and rhythm guitars, lead and backing vocals, E-bow
 Heather Findlay – lead and backing vocals, acoustic guitar, tambourine
 Iain Jennings – keyboards, backing vocals
 Liam Davison – 6- and 12- string electric and acoustic rhythm guitars, backing vocals
 Bob Faulds – violins
 Stuart Carver – bass
 Kev Gibbons – high and low whistles
 Allan Scott – drums

Additional personnel
Angela Goldthorpe – flutes
Chè – djembe
Produced and engineered by John Spence at Fairview Studio, Willerby, Hull.

References

Mostly Autumn albums
1998 debut albums